Political party strength in U.S. states is the level of representation of the various political parties in the United States in each statewide elective office providing legislators to the state and to the U.S. Congress and electing the executives at the state (U.S. state governor) and national (U.S. President) level.

History

Throughout most of the 20th century, although the Republican and Democratic parties alternated in power at a national level, some states were so overwhelmingly dominated by one party that nomination was usually tantamount to election.  This was especially true in the Solid South, where the Democratic Party was dominant for the better part of a century, from the end of Reconstruction in the late 1870s, through the period of Jim Crow Laws into the 1960s. Conversely, the New England states of Vermont, Maine, and New Hampshire were dominated by the Republican Party, as were some Midwestern states like Iowa and North Dakota.

However, in the 1970s and 1980s the increasingly conservative Republican Party gradually overtook the Democrats in the southeast. The Democrats' support in the formerly Solid South had been eroded during the vast cultural, political, and economic upheaval that surrounded the 1960s. By the 1990s, the Republican Party had completed the transition into the southeast's dominant political party, despite typically having fewer members due to the prevalence of Republican voting generational Democrats.  In New England, the opposite trend occurred; the former Republican strongholds of Maine and Vermont became solidly Democratic, as did formerly Republican areas of New Jersey, New York, and Connecticut.

In the U.S. state legislative elections of 2010, the Republican Party held an outright majority of 3,890 seats (53% of total) compared to the Democratic party's 3,450 (47% of total) seats elected on a partisan ballot. Of the 7,382 seats in all of the state legislatures combined, independents and third parties account for only 16 members, not counting the 49 members of the Nebraska Legislature, which is the only legislature in the nation to hold non-partisan elections to determine its members. As a result of the 2010 elections, Republicans took control of an additional 19 state legislative chambers, giving them majority control of both chambers in 25 states versus the Democrats' majority control of both chambers in only 16 states, with 8 states having split or inconclusive control of both chambers (not including Nebraska); previous to the 2010 elections, it was Democrats who controlled both chambers in 27 states versus the Republican party having total control in only 14 states, with eight states divided and Nebraska being nonpartisan.

Since this election, Republicans have maintained a majority of state legislative chambers and seats, as well as governorships nationwide. As of 2023, there are 23 Republican trifectas, 17 Democratic trifectas, and 10 divided governments with both parties holding either legislative chambers or the governorship. However, following the 2022 elections, Democratic trifectas represent a majority of the national population.

Current party strength

Cook Partisan Voting Index (PVI)

Another metric measuring party preference is the Cook Partisan Voting Index (PVI). Cook PVIs are calculated by comparing a state's average Democratic Party or Republican Party share of the two-party presidential vote in the past two presidential elections to the nation's average share of the same. PVIs for the states over time can be used to show the trends of U.S. states towards, or away from, one party or the other.

Gallup 
On December 17, 2020, Gallup polling found that 31% of Americans identified as Democrats, 25% identified as Republicans, and 41% as Independent. Additionally, polling showed that 50% are either "Democrats or Democratic leaners" and 39% are either "Republicans or Republican leaners" when Independents were asked, "do you lean more to the Democratic Party or the Republican Party?"

In 2018, the number of competitive states according to opinion polling dropped down to 10, the lowest number since 2008. From 2017 to 2018, New Hampshire, Nevada, and Pennsylvania moved from competitive to lean Democratic, while West Virginia, Louisiana, and Indiana moved from competitive to lean Republican, and Nebraska moved from lean Republican to competitive.

As of 2018, Massachusetts was the most Democratic state, with 56% of residents identifying as Democrats, while only 27% of residents identified as Republicans. However, it is important to note that Washington D.C. (while not a state) has 3 electoral votes and 76% of residents identify as Democrats, while 6% identify as Republicans. Wyoming was the most Republican state, with 59% of residents identifying as Republican, and only 25% of residents identifying as Democratic.

Voter registration
The state Democratic or Republican Party controls the governorship, the state legislative houses, and U.S. Senate representation. Nebraska's legislature is unicameral (i.e., it has only one legislative house) and is officially non-partisan, though party affiliation still has an unofficial influence on the legislative process.

The simplest measure of party strength in a state voting population is the affiliation totals from voter registration from the websites of the Secretaries of State or state Boards of Elections for the 31 states and the District of Columbia that allow registered voters to indicate a party preference when registering to vote. 19 states do not include party preference with voter registration. The party affiliations in the party control table are obtained from state party registration figures where indicated. 

As of October 2022, a plurality of voters in California, Nevada, New Mexico, Louisiana, Delaware, New Jersey, New York, Pennsylvania, and Maine are Democratic, while a majority of Maryland voters are Democrats. Meanwhile, a plurality of voters in Arizona, South Dakota, Nebraska, Kansas, Iowa, Kentucky, West Virginia, and Florida are Republicans. A majority of voters in Utah, Idaho, Wyoming, and Oklahoma are Republicans. In Oregon, Colorado, North Carolina, Connecticut, Rhode Island, Massachusetts, and New Hampshire, a plurality of voters are Independents. While in Alaska and Arkansas, a majority of voters are independents.

Party strength by region
Local and regional political circumstances often influence party strength.

U.S. state party control as of

State government

Historical party strength
The number of state legislatures controlled by each party.

The state governorships controlled by each party.

State government full or split control, by party.

Graphical summary

References